Denis Gremelmayr, who was the defending champion, lost to Alexander Peya already in the first round.
Daniel Brands won in the final match 6–4, 6–4, against Dustin Brown.

Seeds

Draw

Finals

Top half

Bottom half

References
 Main Draw
 Qualifying Draw

2009 ATP Challenger Tour
2009 Singles